Ocyplanus is a genus of beetles belonging to the family Staphylinidae.

Species:

Ocyplanus brevicollis 
Ocyplanus formicarius 
Ocyplanus guineanus 
Ocyplanus megalops 
Ocyplanus rotundiceps

References

Staphylinidae
Staphylinidae genera